The Grumman F6F Hellcat is an American carrier-based fighter aircraft of World War II. Designed to replace the earlier F4F Wildcat and to counter the Japanese Mitsubishi A6M Zero, it was the United States Navy's dominant fighter in the second half of the Pacific War. In gaining that role, it prevailed over its faster competitor, the Vought F4U Corsair, which initially had problems with visibility and carrier landings.

Powered by a  Pratt & Whitney R-2800 Double Wasp, the same powerplant used for both the Corsair and the United States Army Air Forces (USAAF) Republic P-47 Thunderbolt fighters, the F6F was an entirely new design, but it still resembled the Wildcat in many ways. Some military observers tagged the Hellcat as the "Wildcat's big brother".

The F6F made its combat debut in September 1943. It subsequently established itself as a rugged, well-designed carrier fighter, which was able to outperform the A6M Zero and help secure air superiority over the Pacific theater. In total, 12,275 were built in just over two years.

Hellcats were credited with destroying a total of 5,223 enemy aircraft while in service with the U.S. Navy, U.S. Marine Corps, and Royal Navy Fleet Air Arm (FAA). This was more than any other Allied naval aircraft. After the war,  Hellcats were phased out of front-line service in the US, but radar-equipped F6F-5Ns remained in service as late as 1954 as night fighters.

Design and development

XF6F

Grumman had been working on a successor to the F4F Wildcat since 1938, and the contract for the prototype XF6F-1 was signed on 30 June 1941. Instead of the Wildcat's narrow-track, hand-cranked, main landing gear retracting into the fuselage inherited from the F3F ( a design from the 1930s Grumman FF-1 fighter biplane), the Hellcat had wide-set, hydraulically actuated landing-gear struts that rotated through 90° while retracting backwards into the wings, but with full wheel doors fitted to the struts that covered the entire strut and the upper half of the main wheel when retracted, and twisted with the main gear struts through 90° during retraction. The wing was mounted lower on the fuselage and was able to be hydraulically or manually folded, with each panel outboard of the undercarriage bay folding backwards from pivoting on a specially oriented, Grumman-patented "Sto-Wing" diagonal axis pivoting system much like the earlier F4F, with a folded stowage position parallel to the fuselage with the leading edges pointing diagonally down.

Throughout early 1942, Leroy Grumman, along with his chief designers Jake Swirbul and Bill Schwendler, worked closely with the U.S. Navy's Bureau of Aeronautics (BuAer) and experienced F4F pilots, to develop the new fighter in such a way that it could counter the Zero's strengths and help gain air dominance in the Pacific Theater of Operations. On 22 April 1942, Lieutenant Commander Butch O'Hare toured the Grumman Aircraft company and spoke with Grumman engineers, analyzing the performance of the F4F Wildcat against the Mitsubishi A6M Zero in aerial combat.  BuAer's Lt Cdr A. M. Jackson  directed Grumman's designers to mount the cockpit higher in the fuselage. In addition, the forward fuselage sloped down slightly to the engine cowling, giving the Hellcat's pilot good visibility.

Change of powerplant
Based on combat accounts of encounters between the F4F Wildcat and A6M Zero, on 26 April 1942, BuAer directed Grumman to install the more-powerful, 18-cylinder Pratt & Whitney R-2800 Double Wasp radial engine – which was already in use with Chance Vought's Corsair since 1940 – in the second XF6F-1 prototype. Grumman complied by redesigning and strengthening the F6F airframe to incorporate the  R-2800-10, driving a three-bladed Hamilton Standard propeller. With this combination, Grumman estimated the XF6F-3s performance would increase by 25% over that of the XF6F-1. The Cyclone-powered XF6F-1 (02981) first flew on 26 June 1942, followed by the first Double Wasp-equipped aircraft, the XF6F-3 (02982), which first flew on 30 July 1942.

Further development

The F6F series was designed to take damage and get the pilot safely back to base. A  self-sealing fuel tank was fitted in the fuselage. Standard armament on the F6F-3 consisted of six .50 in (12.7 mm) M2/AN Browning air-cooled machine guns with 400 rounds per gun. Six  High Velocity Aircraft Rockets (HVARs) could be carried – three under each wing on "zero-length" launchers.

Two night-fighter subvariants of the F6F-3 were developed; the 18 F6F-3Es were converted from standard-3s and featured the AN/APS-4 10 GHz frequency radar in a pod mounted on a rack beneath the right wing, with a small radar scope fitted in the middle of the main instrument panel and radar operating controls installed on the port side of the cockpit. The later F6F-3N, first flown in July 1943, was fitted with the AN/APS-6 radar in the fuselage, with the antenna dish in a bulbous fairing mounted on the leading edge of the outer right wing as a development of the AN/APS-4; about 200 F6F-3Ns were built. Hellcat night fighters claimed their first victories in November 1943. In total, 4,402 F6F-3s were built through until April 1944, when production was changed to the F6F-5.

The F6F-5 featured several improvements, including a more powerful R-2800-10W engine employing a water-injection system and housed in a slightly more streamlined engine cowling, spring-loaded control tabs on the ailerons, and an improved, clear-view windscreen, with a flat armored-glass front panel replacing the F6F-3's curved plexiglass panel and internal armor glass screen. In addition, the rear fuselage and tail units were strengthened, and apart from some early production aircraft, most of the F6F-5s built were painted in an overall gloss sea-blue finish. After the first few F6F-5s were built, the small windows behind the main canopy were deleted. The F6F-5N night-fighter variant was fitted with an AN/APS-6 radar in a fairing on the outer-starboard wing. A few standard F6F-5s were also fitted with camera equipment for reconnaissance duties as the F6F-5P. While all F6F-5s were capable of carrying an armament mix of one 20-mm (.79-in) M2 cannon in each of the inboard gun bays (220 rounds per gun), along with two pairs of .50-in (12.7-mm) machine guns (each with 400 rounds per gun), this configuration was only used on later F6F-5N night fighters. The F6F-5 was the most common F6F variant, with 7,870 being built.

Other prototypes in the F6F series included the XF6F-4 (02981, a conversion of the XF6F-1 powered by an R-2800-27 and armed with four 20-mm M2 cannon), which first flew on 3 October 1942 as the prototype for the projected F6F-4. This version never entered production and 02981 was converted to an F6F-3 production aircraft. Another experimental prototype was the XF6F-2 (66244), an F6F-3 converted to use a Wright R-2600-15, fitted with a Birman-manufactured mixed-flow turbocharger, which was later replaced by a Pratt & Whitney R-2800-21, also fitted with a Birman turbocharger. The turbochargers proved to be unreliable on both engines, while performance improvements were marginal. As with the XF6F-4, 66244 was soon converted back to a standard F6F-3. Two XF6F-6s (70188 and 70913) were converted from F6F-5s and used the 18-cylinder  Pratt and Whitney R-2800-18W two-stage supercharged radial engine with water injection and driving a Hamilton-Standard four-bladed propeller.

The last Hellcat rolled out in November 1945, the total production being 12,275, of which 11,000 had been built in just two years. This high production rate was credited to the sound original design, which required little modification once production was under way.

Operational history

U.S. Navy and Marines
The U.S. Navy much preferred the more docile flight qualities of the F6F compared with the Vought F4U Corsair, despite the superior speed of the Corsair. This preference was especially noted during carrier landings, a critical success requirement for the Navy. The Corsair was thus released by the Navy to the Marine Corps, which without the need to worry about carrier landings, used the Corsair to immense effect in land-based sorties. The Hellcat remained the standard USN carrier-borne fighter until the F4U series was finally cleared for U.S. carrier operations in late 1944 (the carrier landing issues had by now been tackled largely due to use of Corsair by the Royal Navy Fleet Air Arm, which started in 1943). In addition to its good flight qualities, the Hellcat was easy to maintain and had an airframe tough enough to withstand the rigors of routine carrier operations. Like the Wildcat, the Hellcat was designed for ease of manufacture and ability to withstand significant damage.

The Hellcat first saw action against the Japanese on 1 September 1943, when fighters off  shot down a Kawanishi H8K "Emily" flying boat. Soon after, on 23 and 24 November, Hellcats engaged Japanese aircraft over Tarawa, shooting down a claimed 30 Mitsubishi Zeros for the loss of one F6F. Over Rabaul, New Britain, on 11 November 1943, Hellcats and F4U Corsairs were engaged in day-long fights with many Japanese aircraft including A6M Zeros, claiming nearly 50 aircraft.

When trials were flown against a captured A6M5 model Zero, they showed that the Hellcat was faster at all altitudes. The F6F out-climbed the Zero marginally above  and rolled faster at speeds above . The Japanese fighter could out-turn its American opponent with ease at low speed and enjoyed a slightly better rate of climb below . The trials report concluded:

Hellcats were the major U.S. Navy fighter type involved in the Battle of the Philippine Sea, where so many Japanese aircraft were shot down that Navy aircrews nicknamed the battle the "Great Marianas Turkey Shoot". The F6F accounted for 75% of all aerial victories recorded by the U.S. Navy in the Pacific. Radar-equipped Hellcat night-fighter squadrons appeared in early 1944.

A formidable opponent for the Hellcat was the Kawanishi N1K, but it was produced too late and in insufficient numbers to affect the outcome of the war.

Sortie, kill, and loss figures
U.S. Navy and Marine F6F pilots flew 66,530 combat sorties and claimed 5,163 kills (56% of all U.S. Navy/Marine air victories of the war) at a recorded cost of 270 Hellcats in aerial combat (an overall kill-to-loss ratio of 19:1 based on claimed kills). Claimed victories were often highly exaggerated during the war. Even so, the aircraft performed well against the best Japanese opponents with a claimed 13:1 kill ratio against the A6M Zero, 9.5:1 against the Nakajima Ki-84, and 3.7:1 against the Mitsubishi J2M during the last year of the war. The F6F became the prime ace-maker aircraft in the American inventory, with 305 Hellcat aces. The U.S. successes were not just   attributed to superior aircraft; from 1942 onwards, they faced increasingly inexperienced Japanese aviators and had the advantage of increasing numerical superiority. In the ground-attack role, Hellcats dropped 6,503 tons (5,899 tonnes) of bombs.

The U.S. Navy's all-time leading ace, Captain David McCampbell, scored all his 34 victories in the Hellcat. He once described the F6F as "... an outstanding fighter plane. It performed well, was easy to fly, and was a stable gun platform, but what I really remember most was that it was rugged and easy to maintain."

During the course of World War II, 2,462 F6F Hellcats were lost to all causes – 270 in aerial combat, 553 to antiaircraft ground and shipboard fire, and 341 due to operational causes. Of the total figure, 1,298 were destroyed in training and ferry operations, normally outside of the combat zones.

Hamilton McWhorter III, a Navy aviator and a flying ace of World War II, was credited with shooting down 12 Japanese aircraft. He was the first U.S. Navy aviator to become an ace while flying the Grumman F6F Hellcat and the first Navy carrier pilot to achieve double ace status.

Arthur Van Haren, Jr., a Navy combat Hellcat ace of WWII from Arizona, was credited with shooting down 9 Japanese planes. He was awarded a DFC, and a Gold Star in lieu of a second DFC. In 2012, Van Haren, Jr. was inducted into the Arizona Aviation Hall of Fame.

British use

The British Fleet Air Arm (FAA) received 1,263 F6Fs under the Lend-Lease Act; initially, it was known as the Grumman Gannet Mark I. The name Hellcat replaced it in early 1943 for the sake of simplicity, the Royal Navy at that time adopting the use of the existing American naval names for all the U.S.-made aircraft supplied to it, with the F6F-3 being designated Hellcat F Mk. I, the F6F-5, the Hellcat F Mk. II and the F6F-5N, the Hellcat NF Mk. II. They saw action off Norway, in the Mediterranean, and in the Far East. Several were fitted with photographic reconnaissance equipment similar to the F6F-5P, receiving the designation Hellcat FR Mk. II. The Pacific War being primarily a naval war, the FAA Hellcats primarily faced land-based aircraft in the European and Mediterranean theaters, so experienced far fewer opportunities for air-to-air combat than their USN/Marines counterparts; nevertheless, they claimed a total of 52 enemy aircraft kills during 18 aerial combats from May 1944 to July 1945. 1844 Naval Air Squadron, on board  of the British Pacific Fleet was the highest-scoring unit, with 32.5 kills.

FAA Hellcats, as with other Lend-Lease aircraft, were rapidly replaced by British aircraft after the end of the war, with only two of the 12 squadrons equipped with the Hellcat at VJ-Day still retaining Hellcats by the end of 1945. These two squadrons were disbanded in 1946.

Postwar use
After the war, the Hellcat was succeeded by the F8F Bearcat, which was smaller, more powerful (powered by uprated Double Wasp radials) and more maneuverable, but entered service too late to see combat in World War II.

The Hellcat was used for second-line USN duties, including training and Naval Reserve squadrons, and a handful were converted to target drones. In late 1952, Guided Missile Unit 90 used F6F-5K drones, each carrying a  bomb, to attack bridges in Korea.

The F6F-5 was the first aircraft used by the U.S. Navy's Blue Angels official flight demonstration team at its formation in 1946.

The French Navy (Aéronavale) was equipped with F6F-5 Hellcats and used them in combat in Indochina. These were painted in Gloss Sea Blue, similar to post-World War II US Navy aircraft until about 1955, but had a modified French roundel with an image of an anchor. The French Air Force also used the Hellcat in Indochina from 1950 to 1952. The plane equipped four squadrons (including the Normandie-Niemen squadron of WWII fame) before these units transitioned to the F8F Bearcat.

The Uruguayan Navy also used them until the early 1960s.

Variants

XF6F prototypes
XF6F-1
First prototype, powered by a two-stage  Wright R-2600-10 Cyclone 14 radial piston engine.
XF6F-2
The first XF6F-1 prototype revised and fitted with a turbocharged Wright R-2600-16 Cyclone radial piston engine. R-2600 replaced by turbocharged R-2800-21.

XF6F-3
 Second prototype fitted with a two-stage supercharged  Pratt & Whitney R-2800-10 Double Wasp radial piston engine.
XF6F-4
One F6F-3 fitted with a two-stage, two-speed supercharged  Pratt & Whitney R-2800-27 Double Wasp radial piston engine.
XF6F-6
Two F6F-5s that were fitted with the  Pratt & Whitney R-2800-18W radial piston engine, and four-bladed propellers.

Series production
F6F-3 (British designation Gannet F. Mk. I, and then later, renamed Hellcat F. Mk. I, January 1944)
Single-seat fighter, fighter-bomber aircraft, powered by a  Pratt & Whitney R-2800-10 Double Wasp radial piston engine.
F6F-3E
Night fighter version, equipped with an AN/APS-4 radar in a fairing on the starboard outer wing.

F6F-3N
Another night fighter version, equipped with a newer AN/APS-6 radar in a fairing on the starboard outer wing.

F6F-5 Hellcat (British Hellcat F. Mk. II)
Improved version, with a redesigned engine cowling, a new windscreen structure with an integral bulletproof windscreen, new ailerons and strengthened tail surfaces; powered by a  Pratt & Whitney R-2800-10W (-W denotes Water Injection) radial piston engine.
F6F-5K Hellcat
A number of F6F-5s and F6F-5Ns were converted into radio-controlled target drones.

F6F-5N Hellcat (British Hellcat N.F. Mk II)
Night fighter version, fitted with an AN/APS-6 radar. Some were armed with two 20 mm (0.79 in) AN/M2 cannon in the inner wing bays and four 0.50 in (12.7 mm) M2 Browning machine guns in the outer.
F6F-5P Hellcat
Small numbers of F6F-5s were converted into photo-reconnaissance aircraft, with the camera equipment being fitted in the rear fuselage.
Hellcat FR. Mk. II
This designation was given to British Hellcats fitted with camera equipment.
FV-1
Proposed designation for Hellcats to be built by Canadian Vickers; cancelled before any built.

Operators

French Navy
French Air Force 

Royal Navy Fleet Air Arm
Training units, and non-operational units
706 Naval Air Squadron Crew Pool & Refresher Flying Training School.
709 Naval Air Squadron Ground Attack School.
731  Naval Air Squadron Night Fighter Training School.
778 Naval Air Squadron Service Trials Unit (STU)
891 Naval Air Squadron not operational at war's end.
1847 Naval Air Squadron merged into 1840, not operational.
East Indies units
800 Naval Air Squadron , first operational unit 
808 Naval Air Squadron 
888 Naval Air Squadron detachments only
896 Naval Air Squadron 
898 Naval Air Squadron /
Atlantic & Mediterranean units
881 Naval Air Squadron 
892 Naval Air Squadron 
1832 Naval Air Squadron 
Pacific units
885 Naval Air Squadron 
1839 Naval Air Squadron NAS Eglington/
1840 Naval Air Squadron 
1844 Naval Air Squadron 

United States Navy
United States Marine Corps

Uruguayan Navy

Surviving aircraft
A relatively large number of Grumman F6Fs survive to this day, either in museums or in flyable condition. In order of Bu.No. they are:

United Kingdom

On display
F6F-5
 79779 – Fleet Air Arm Museum in RNAS Yeovilton.

United States

Airworthy
F6F-3
 41476 – based at the Collings Foundation in Stow, Massachusetts.
 41930 – privately owned in Houston, Texas.
F6F-5
 70222 – based at Commemorative Air Force (Southern California Wing) at Camarillo Airport (former Oxnard AFB) in Camarillo, California.
 78645 – based at Fagen Fighters WWII Museum in Granite Falls, Minnesota.
 79863 – based at Flying Heritage Collection in Everett, Washington.
 94204 – based at Erickson Aircraft Collection in Madras, Oregon.
 94473 – based at Palm Springs Air Museum in Palm Springs, California.
On display
F6F-3
 25910 – National Naval Aviation Museum at NAS Pensacola in Pensacola, Florida.
 41834 – Steven F. Udvar-Hazy Center of the National Air and Space Museum in Chantilly, Virginia.
 42874 – San Diego Aerospace Museum in San Diego, California.
 66237 – Naval Air Station Wildwood Aviation Museum at Cape May Airport in Lower Township, New Jersey.
F6F-5

 77722 – Naval Air Facility Washington at Joint Base Andrews<ref>"Grumman F6F Hellcat/Bu. 77722." Warbird Directory: Grumman Page 12." Retrieved: 21 September 2022.</ref>
 79192 – New England Air Museum in Windsor Locks, Connecticut.
 79593 – /Patriots Point Naval & Maritime Museum in Mount Pleasant, South Carolina.
 79683 – Air Zoo in Kalamazoo, Michigan.
 94203 – National Naval Aviation Museum at NAS Pensacola in Pensacola, Florida.
 94263 – Cradle of Aviation Museum in New York. It is on loan from the USMC Museum in Quantico, Virginia.
Under restoration or in storage
F6F-3
 43014 – in storage at the Fantasy of Flight in Polk City, Florida.
F6F-5
 72094 – to airworthiness by private owner in Caldwell, Idaho.
 79133 – to airworthiness by private owner in Wilmington, Delaware.
 80040 – to airworthiness by private owner in Wilmington, Delaware.
 93879 – to airworthiness by Yanks Air Museum in Chino, California."FAA Registry: N4994V" Federal Aviation Administration. Retrieved: 15 July 2021.
 94038 – to airworthiness by private owner in Wilmington, Delaware.
 94385 – to airworthiness by private owner in Livermore, California.

Specifications (F6F-5 Hellcat)

See also

References

Notes

Citations

Bibliography

 Anderton, David A. Hellcat. London: Jane's Publishing Company Ltd., 1981. .
 Barber, S.B. Naval Aviation Combat Statistics: World War II, OPNAV-P-23V No. A129. Washington, D.C.: Air Branch, Office of Naval Intelligence, 1946.
 Bridgman, Leonard, ed. "The Grumman Hellcat." Jane’s Fighting Aircraft of World War II. London: Studio, 1946. .
 Brown, Eric, CBE, DCS, AFC, RN., William Green and Gordon Swanborough. "Grumman Hellcat". Wings of the Navy, Flying Allied Carrier Aircraft of World War Two. London: Jane's Publishing Company, 1980, pp. 167–176. .
 Dann, Lcdr. Richard S., USNR. F6F Hellcat Walk Around. Carrollton, Texas: Squadron/Signal Publications Inc., 1996. .
 Dean, Francis H. America's Hundred Thousand. Atglen, Pennsylvania: Schiffer Publishing Ltd., 1997. .
 Donald, David, ed. American Warplanes of World War II. London: Aerospace Publishing, 1995. .
 Drendel, Lou. "Grumman F6F Hellcat". U.S. Navy Carrier Fighters of World War II. Carrollton, Texas: Squadron/Signal Publications Inc., 1987, pp. 45–68. .
 Ewing, Steve. Reaper Leader: The Life of Jimmy Flatley. Annapolis, Maryland: Naval Institute Press, 2002. .
 Ewing, Steve. Thach Weave: The Life of Jimmie Thach. Annapolis, Maryland: Naval Institute Press, 2004..
 Ewing, Steve and John B. Lundstrom. Fateful Rendezvous: The Life of Butch O'Hare. Annapolis, Maryland: Bluejacket Books, (Naval Institute Press), 2004. .
 Faltum, Andrew. The Essex Aircraft Carriers. Baltimore, Maryland: The Nautical & Aviation Publishing Company of America, 1996. .
 Ferguson, Robert G. "One Thousand Planes a Day: Ford, Grumman, General Motors and the Arsenal of Democracy."History and Technology, Volume 21, Issue 2, 2005.
 Francillon, Réne J. Grumman Aircraft Since 1929. Annapolis, Maryland: Naval Institute Press, 1989.  .
 Graff, Cory. F6F Hellcat at War (The At War Series). Minneapolis, Minneapolis: Zenith Press, 2009. .
 Green, William. Famous Fighters of the Second World War. Garden City, New York: Doubleday & Company, 1975..
 Green, William and Gordon Swanborough. "Grumman F6F Hellcat". WW2 Fact Files: US Navy and Marine Corps Fighters. London: Macdonald and Jane's Publishers Ltd., 1976, pp. 47–56. .
 Gunston, Bill. Grumman: Sixty Years of Excellence. London: Orion Books, 1988. .
 Hill, Richard M. Grumman F6F-3/5 Hellcat in USN-USMC-FAA-Aeronavale & Uruguayan Service. Reading, Berkshire, UK: Osprey Publications Ltd., 1971. .
 Jackson, Robert.  Air War Korea 1950–1953. Shrewsbury, UK: Airlife Publishing, 1998. .
 Jarski, Adam and Waldemar Pajdosz. F6F Hellcat (Monografie Lotnicze 15) (in Polish). Gdańsk, Poland: AJ-Press, 1994. .
 Jarski, Adam and Waldemar Pajdosz. F6F Hellcat (Aircraft Monograph 20). Gdańsk, Poland: AJ-Press, 2007.
 Kinzey, Bert. F6F Hellcat in detail and scale (D&S Vol.26). Shrewsbury, UK: AirLife Publishing Ltd., 1987..
 Kinzey, Bert. F6F Hellcat in detail and scale: Revised edition (D&S Vol.49). Carrollton, Texas: Squadron/Signal Publications Inc., 1996. .
 Kit, Mister and Jean-Pierre DeCock. F6F Hellcat (in French). Paris, France: Éditions Atlas s.a., 1981.
 Krist, Jan. Bojové Legendy: Grumman F6F Hellcat (in Czech). Prague, Czech Republic: Jan Vašut s.r.o., 2006. .
 Mendenhall, Charles A. Wildcats & Hellcats: Gallant Grummans in World War II. St. Paul, Minnesota: Motorbooks International, 1984. .
 Mondey, David. American Aircraft of World War II (Hamlyn Concise Guide). London: Bounty Books, 2006. .
 Norton, Bill. U.S. Experimental & Prototype Aircraft Projects: Fighters 1939–1945. North Branch, Minnesota: Specialty Press, 2008, pp. 80–85. .
 O'Leary, Michael. United States Naval Fighters of World War II in Action. Poole, Dorset, UK: Blandford Press, 1980. .
 "OPNAV-P23V No. A129, 17 June 1946." Naval Aviation Combat Statistics World War II. Suitland, Maryland: Air Branch, Office of Naval Intelligence, Office of the Chief of Naval Operations, 1946.
 Spick, Mike. Fighter Pilot Tactics . The Techniques of Daylight Air Combat. Cambridge, UK: Patrick Stephens, 1983. .
 Styling, Mark. Corsair Aces of World War 2 (Osprey Aircraft of the Aces No 8). London: Osprey Publishing, 1995. .
 Sullivan, Jim. F6F Hellcat in action. Carrollton, Texas: Squadron/Signal Publications Inc., 1979. .
 Taylor, John W. R. "Grumman F6F Hellcat." Combat Aircraft of the World from 1909 to the present. New York: G.P. Putnam's Sons, 1969. .
 Thetford, Owen. British Naval Aircraft Since 1912, Fourth Edition. London: Putnam, 1994. .
 Thomas, Geoff. US Navy Carrier Aircraft Colours: Units, Colours, Markings, and Operations during World War 2. New Malden, UK: Air Research Publications, 1989. .
 Thruelsen, Richard. The Grumman Story. Westport, Connecticut: Praeger Publishers, 1976. .
 Tillman, Barrett. Hellcat Aces of World War 2. London: Osprey Aerospace, 1996. .
 Tillman, Barrett. Hellcat: The F6F in World War II. Annapolis, Maryland: Naval Institute Press, 1979. .
 White, Graham. R-2800: Pratt & Whitney's Dependable Masterpiece. Warrendale, Pennsylvania: Society of Automotive Engineers Inc., 2001. .
 Winchester, Jim, ed. "Grumman F6F Hellcat." Aircraft of World War II (Aviation Fact File). Rochester, UK: Grange Books plc, 2004. .
 Zbiegniewski, Andre R. Grumman F6F Hellcat (Kagero Monografie No.10)'' (Bilingual Polish/English). Lublin, Poland: Kagero, 2004. .

External links

Final flight test report of F6F-3, USN Air Station, Patuxent River (pdf file)
F6F Hellcat Performance Trials, Aircraft and Armament Experimental Establishment (A&AEE), Boscombe Down
Performance test, each 1,00th aircraft; F6F-5 No 58310, USN Air Station, Patuxent River (pdf file)
USN & USMC Aircraft Serial and Bureau Nos. 1911 to present
"How The Hellcat Got That Way", Popular Science, December 1943, World War Two article which is large and detailed

F06F Hellcat
Grumman F6F
Grumman F6F
Single-engined tractor aircraft
Low-wing aircraft
Carrier-based aircraft
Aircraft first flown in 1942